Latinius Silvius (said to have reigned 1079–1028 BC) was the fourth descendant of Aeneas and fourth in the list of mythical kings of Alba Longa (according to Livy). Titus Livius credits him with founding a majority of the settlements in Latium. It is, however, unclear if this person ever existed.

Family tree

Note

Kings of Alba Longa
Kings in Greek mythology

References 

 Dionysus of Halicarnassus, Roman Antiquities. English translation by Earnest Cary in the Loeb Classical Library, 7 volumes. Harvard University Press, 1937–1950. Online version at Bill Thayer's Web Site
 Dionysius of Halicarnassus, Antiquitatum Romanarum quae supersunt, Vol I-IV. . Karl Jacoby. In Aedibus B.G. Teubneri. Leipzig. 1885. Greek text available at the Perseus Digital Library.

pl:Latinus